"A Thousand Miles Away" is a 1956 song recorded by the American doo-wop group The Heartbeats. The song was written by James Sheppard and William H. Miller.

Background
Sheppard co-wrote the song after his ex-girlfriend moved away to Texas.

Track listing
7" Vinyl
 a. "A Thousand Miles Away" - 2:22
 b. "Oh Baby Don't" - 2:25

Chart performance
"A Thousand Miles Away" reached #5 on the R&B Singles chart and #52 in the US on The Billboard Hot 100.
A 1960, reissue had the song peak at #96 on the Hot 100.

Cover versions
Other artists who have released a cover versions of the song are:
The Fleetwoods
The Diamonds 
Harry Nilsson released a cover version of the song.

In popular culture
The song was featured in the 1973 film "American Graffiti".

References

1957 singles
The Fleetwoods songs
The Diamonds songs
1957 songs
Roulette Records singles